"BE" (Original Stage Production) is the second live album by Swedish progressive metal band Pain of Salvation, documenting one of the performances of their 2004 album BE in its entirety in Eskilstuna, Sweden, on 12 September 2003. In contrast to the studio album, The Orchestra of Eternity (a nine-piece orchestra accompanying the band) are given credit on the front cover of the album (though they weren't shown on the initial promo release).

Track listing
All music by Daniel Gildenlöw, except "Iter Impius" by Fredrik Hermansson.

"Animae Partus"
"Deus Nova"
"Imago"
"Pluvius Aestivus"
"Lilium Cruentus"
"Nauticus"
"Dea Pecuniae"
"Vocari Dei"
"Diffidentia"
"Nihil Morari"
"Latericius Valete"
"Omni"
"Iter Impius"
"Martius/Nauticus II"
"Animae Partus II"

The track listing is identical for both the CD and DVD, which are in turn identical to the studio release of "BE".

Personnel 
Daniel Gildenlöw – lead vocals, electric and acoustic guitars, mandola, percussion
Johan Hallgren – electric and acoustic guitars, vocals, percussion 
Fredrik Hermansson – grand piano, harpsichord, percussion
Kristoffer Gildenlöw – fretted and fretless basses, double bass, vocals, percussion
Johan Langell – drums, percussion

The Orchestra of Eternity
Mihai Cucu – first violin
Camilla Arvidsson – second violin
Kristina Ekman – viola
Magnus Lanning – cello
Åsa Karlberg – flute
Anette Kumlin – oboe
Nils-Åke Pettersson – clarinet
Dries van den Poel – bass clarinet
Sven-Oloe Juvas – tuba

Backtrack musicians
Daniel Gildenlöw – harmony vocals, choirs, guitars, keyboards, samplers, Chinese archo
Mats Stenlund – church organ
Cecilia Ringkvist – vocals
Donald Morgan – narration
Donald K. Morgan – narration
Alex R. Morgan – narration
Kim Howatt – news reading, Cindy (Sandra!)
Jim Howatt – news reading
Blair Wilson – Miss Mediocrity
Gaby Howatt – Miss Mediocrity
Various people from around the world – voice messages to God

Concept, research, original stories, lyrics, narrations and texts by Daniel Gildenlöw.

All orchestral arrangements by Daniel Gildenlöw, except "Iter Impius" by Fredrik Hermansson and "Imago" by Jan Levander and Daniel Gildenlöw.

References

Pain of Salvation albums
Concept albums
2005 live albums
2005 video albums
Live video albums
Inside Out Music live albums
Inside Out Music video albums